Zgorzelec is the railway station located in the Ujazd district of Zgorzelec, Lower Silesia, Poland. It is one of the two railway stations in the town, the other being Zgorzelec Miasto.

History

When the branch line of Lower Silesian-Mark Railway Company, operating Berlin–Wrocław railway, from Kohlfurth (nowadays Węgliniec) to Görlitz opened on 1 September 1847, it ran past the village of Moys. The railway junction at Moys was created when the Silesian Mountain Railway from Görlitz to Hirschberg (nowadays Jelenia Góra) was opened in 1865, but the junction didn't have a passenger station to serve the village until 1876.

On 15 December 2019 electrificted railway line 278 Węgliniec – Zgorzelec.

Train services
The station is on PKP railway lines no. 278, which connects this station to Węgliniec, and no. 274, which connects Görlitz resp. the German-polish border via Zgorzelec to Jelenia Góra and further to Wrocław. Both lines are operated by PKP Polskie Linie Kolejowe, the national polish infrastructure manager, and served by Koleje Dolnośląskie, with eleven daily trains in each direction on the former line, and seven daily trains in each direction on the other. Additionally, Zgorzelec station was served by three daily Regional-Express trains running between Wrocław Główny and Dresden Hauptbahnhof from March 2009 until December 2018 (except for a few months in 2015). Since mid-December 2018 these trains run between Dresden, Zgorzelec and Węgliniec only; since 2020 the regular trains from Dresden to Görlitz are extended to Zgorzelec a few times per day.

The station is served by the following service(s):

 Intercity services (IC) Zgorzelec – Legnica – Wrocław – Ostrów Wielkopolski – Łódź – Warszawa
Regional services (PR) Goerlitz (Görlitz station) – Żary – Zielona Góra Główna

References

External links
 
 Koleje Dolnośląskie website

Railway stations in Lower Silesian Voivodeship
Zgorzelec
Railway stations in Poland opened in 1847